The Kansas Academy of Mathematics and Science (KAMS) is a two-year, residential, early-entrance-to-college program for U.S. high school juniors and seniors who are academically talented in the areas of mathematics and science.  Located on the Fort Hays State University campus in Hays, Kansas, students concurrently complete their last two years of high school while earning over 60 college credits.

History
The Kansas Academy of Mathematics and Science was established by legislative action in 2006 by the Kansas Legislature.  The establishment of this program stemmed from national concern regarding anticipated shortages of students who would be sufficiently well prepared in mathematical and scientific problem solving. Recognizing that American youth would need to compete in an increasingly technological global society, Kansas is the 16th state to create alternative educational programs that would attract students to the fields of mathematics and science as well as offer young students an accelerated education in these areas of study.

Fort Hays State University, part of the Kansas Board of Regents system, was chosen to host the Academy after an extensive bid process.  After finding a home, a planning committee worked to develop and shape the Academy including securing resources, hiring staff, promoting the Academy throughout the state, and recruiting students. In August 2009, KAMS opened its doors to the first class of 26 students.

Academics

Admissions process

Information Sessions throughout the state and a Preview Day on the FHSU campus occur in the fall, and completed applications are asked to be completed by December 15. KAMS uses criteria such as ACT/SAT scores, cumulative GPA, class rank, teacher evaluations, personal interviews, essays, and short answer questions in its admissions process to select high school sophomores who are most likely to succeed in an academically challenging environment.  KAMS currently selects approximately 40 Kansas students per class.

Curriculum
KAMS students are expected to earn over 60 college credit hours over the two-year academic program. Students must complete both years to successfully complete the program. Courses are taught by doctoral level professors at Fort Hays State University. Courses include the subject areas of calculus, geometry, chemistry, physics, biology, computer science, English/communication, history, leadership, and a unique global climate change course that all students take together. Students may also be able to take elective courses (such as band, music, theater, foreign language, etc.) as long as the required core curriculum is met.

Research requirement
All KAMS students are required to engage in a research project to successfully complete the program. Students are exposed to various research opportunities both on the FHSU campus and nationwide. Students select their topic and are assigned a mentor in the spring of their junior year. Work is completed throughout the rest of their KAMS experience culminating in a research paper and display presentation at the end of their senior year.

Student life

Residential living
As a residential program, students live in Custer Hall on the FHSU campus that has been designated for Academy students. They live alongside Academy of Mathematics and Science (AMS) students, a program which offers out-of-state and international high school students an opportunity to attain a high school diploma and an Associate of General Studies in Science degree from FHSU. Males and females live on separate wings. The building and wings themselves require key and swipe card access to gain admittance. Students must check in and out of campus whenever leaving. Professional staff live in residence with the students to supervise them while they are out of class, as well as provide developmental and social programming.

Civic engagement
KAMS students are expected to be involved and give back to their community, as well as the state of Kansas at large. Volunteering and community service is an important aspect to being a KAMS student. Group events as well as individual efforts are vital to success as KAMS.

See also
 Alabama School of Mathematics and Science
 Arkansas School for Mathematics, Sciences, and the Arts
 Carol Martin Gatton Academy of Mathematics and Science in Kentucky
 Craft Academy for Excellence in Science and Mathematics
 Illinois Mathematics and Science Academy
 Indiana Academy for Science, Mathematics, and Humanities
 Louisiana School for Math, Science, and the Arts
 Maine School of Science and Mathematics 
 Mississippi School for Mathematics and Science
 North Carolina School of Science and Mathematics
 Oklahoma School of Science and Mathematics
 South Carolina Governor's School for Science and Mathematics
 Texas Academy of Mathematics and Science

References

External links
 

Educational institutions established in 2006
Fort Hays State University
Gifted education
Public high schools in Kansas
Schools in Ellis County, Kansas
Public boarding schools in the United States
Boarding schools in Kansas
2006 establishments in Kansas